BusPlus is the payment method for the GSP Belgrade, Belgrade tram system, Lasta Beograd (only in public transport in Belgrade) and BG TRAIN. It is a thin, plastic card on which the customer electronically loads fares. The BusPlus is managed by company Apex Technology Solutions. Public authorities state that BusPlus was implemented to increase the revenue of the public transit authority and to improve the public transport system by getting better information on usage. Reports from September 2012 have indicated that the overall revenue has increased, but some aspects of integration have been criticized by public. System is installed by Kentkart, an automatic fare collection system integrator company.

History
 29. August 2011 - Began issuing BusPlus card
 31 January 2012 - Open Control Center "Bus Plus"
 1. February 2012 - BusPlus started operating
 1. February 2012 - Commissioner for Information of Public Importance and Personal Data Protection bans data processing in BusPlus system 
 25. September 2012 - A new ban of the Commissioner for Information of Public Importance and Personal Data Protection prohibits processing of some data from scholars in BusPlus system

Fares and BusPlus types

Personalized smart card
Personalized cards are limited in time Pre-paid (monthly and semimonthly). All customers paying monthly or semimonthly  driving, are entitled to unlimited rides on all lines in the ITS 1 and / or ITS 2 in selected areas in the daily traffic (from 04:00 to 24:00 hours).
The personalized card data stored on the cards subspecies (zone, ...), and tariffs are on the card's personal information and photo's for visual control.
Personalized cards are not transferable to another user.
Personalized card must be validated when entering the vehicle (check in).

Non-personalized smart card - electronic wallet
Non-personalized smart card is the type electronic wallet for a ride on public transport. The user card complements the desired amount of money, each achieved a run-off card with the amount that represents the price of the ride. These cards are not time limited and may subsequently be amended at all locations for sale. Non-personalized card must be validated when entering the vehicle (check in). Non-personalized smart card can be registered in the name of the user, but it can also be used by multiple users. By registering a non-personalized card one gets the opportunity to recharge the card through the web portal.

Paper contactless cards
Contactless paper tickets are sold and complement at all locations for sale.
This type of card must be authenticated (validated) at the beginning of the trip (check in).
4025060068040408

Paper tickets from the driver
This is an individual ticket for one ride. Sold by the driver.

BusPlus application 
BusPlus Application is a free app developed by "Apex Solution Technology" which allows its user to:  Search for the nearest station, search for the station by number and search for the station by its name. When the station is selected a bubble will pop up with the list of all buses that go to that station (distance if using "Search for the nearest stations" option) as well as the location of those buses presented on a map. By clicking on a bus on the map you are able to see if the bus is articulated or if the bus has wheelchair support.

BusPlus Customer Service Center
BusPlus call center (customer service) is an information service for users and their complaints. Customer Service works in close coordination and synchronization with the relevant departments of the city.

The main activities of customer service are as follows:
Informing users about the types of cards
Informing users about procedures and locations of issuance / extension / additions to cards
Resolving user complaints
Coordination of procedures of notification and sharing of information regarding the system and its use of the appropriate services

BusPlus Benefit Programs(rewards program)
BusPlus card owners will be able to obtain discounts, special offers and benefits within BusPlus benefit programs.

Security problem
 Personalized smart cards store personal data and therefore, there is a justified risk that data can be used for the purpose of which their owners did not consent or they are not aware of.

Controversy
 Since its introduction in 2011, media often reports violence used by BusPlus controllers during ticket inspection.

References

External links
 BusPlus
 Secretariat for Transport
 Official Android app for real-time GPS bus tracking and bus-stop locating
 Unofficial Android app for USSD/SMS query

Public transport in Serbia
Transport in Belgrade
Contactless smart cards
Fare collection systems